The discography of the Finnish rock band The Rasmus currently consists of ten studio albums, two compilation albums and twenty-nine singles.

Albums

Studio albums

Compilation albums

Video albums

Singles

Music videos

Other releases 
 "Maximum Rasmus" – An unofficial audio CD with the band's biography and some interviews. It was released on 15 November 2004 by the record label Chrome Dream.
 "The Rasmus Player" – A PC software with videos, photos, information and more. It was released on many singles from the album Hide from the Sun, 2005.

B-sides, non-LP and unreleased songs
All songs that do not appear on albums, and their releases.

Notes

References

External links
 The Rasmus' official website
 Lyrics

Discography
Discographies of Finnish artists
Rock music group discographies